The Midland Open is an annual golf tournament played in the English Midlands. The event is currently organised by the Midlands Region of the Professional Golfers' Association.

History
The Midland Professional Golf Club held its first meeting in December 1897. The club held its first championship on 12 May 1898. However the week before, on 3 May, a match was organised at the Coventry club at Whitley Common, between the club and a team of amateurs. The match was played at the Coventry club until 1902, after which it was played at a number of courses. The amateurs won in 1904 at Sandwell Park, but otherwise the professionals were successful, usually by a large margin.

In 1923, the Midland Counties Golf Association agreed to the creation of a new event, involving both amateur and professionals playing individually on level terms. The competition was played the day after the annual amateurs v. professionals match, at the same course, Little Aston. The competitors were the first 25 professionals from the Midland Professional Championship and the leading 15 from the Midland Amateur Championship. Both of these were 36-hole stroke-play events played in a single day, and the new tournament took the same form. Prizes amounting to nearly £100 were given by the Birmingham Gazette. The leading three amateurs received gold medals while there were cash prizes for the leading eight professionals.

Dick Wheildon won the first event in 1923 with Carl Bretherton the leading amateur, tied for 10th place. Michael Bingham won 1924 with Bretherton again the leading amateur, tied for 7th place. There was amateur winner in 1925, Robert Humphries winning by four strokes from George Buckle who took the first prize as the leading professional. Tom Williamson won in 1926 with Bretherton again the leading amateur. In 1927 the field was expanded with the leading 30 professionals and 20 amateurs qualifying. With a number of qualifying amateurs was later increased to 25. The 1930 event was won by an amateur, William Tweddell who had won the Amateur Championship earlier in the year. Tom Williamson was the leading professional. Jim Morris won in 1928 with Stanley Lunt the leading amateur.

In 1929 the order of the Midland Professional Championship and the Midland Challenge Cup was changed, with the championship played earlier in the year and the challenge cup moving to September and becoming the qualifying event for the professionals. Tom Barber won by four strokes, having won the Midland Challenge Cup earlier in the month.In 1930 Michael Bingham became the first player to win the event twice, finishing three strokes ahead of the amateur Eric Fiddian. There was tie in 1931 between Tom Barber and Tom Williamson. There was no playoff and the title was shared. Bert Gadd was another multiple winner, winning in 1934 and 1935. He was followed by the amateur Charlie Stowe who won in 1936 and 1937. Max Faulkner won in 1938 during his break spell as the professional at Leamington Spa. The qualifying events for the 1939 tournament had been held but the Midland Open planned for September was cancelled because of the start of World War II.

The event was revived in 1947 with a new trophy and prize money provided by the Birmingham Post & Mail Ltd. The format remained the same as in the pre-war period, the professionals qualifying through the Midland section of the News of the World Match Play in September. Walter Lees won the event, a stroke ahead of Jack Hargreaves. Bert Williamson won in 1948 with a record low score of 136. 1949 saw the start of a new event, the Midland Amateur-Professional Foursomes, a three-day match-play tournament, also sponsored by the Birmingham Post & Mail. The Midland Open was moved from its late-season date to July with the new foursomes event played immediately after, at the same course. Qualification for the professionals was based on the Midland Professional Championship, held in May. Charlie Ward won the Midland Open by six strokes with a new record of 135, his first win in the event.

There was an amateur success in 1950, with John Llewellyn Morgan winning the event. Charlie Ward, the 1949 winner, won again in 1951, 1952 and 1954, with Frank Miller winning in 1953. There was a three-way tie in 1955 between Frank Jowle, Peter Butler and Jack Hargreaves. There was a 36-hole playoff the following Monday after the foursomes event. Jowle won with a score of 141, with Hargreaves scoring 142 and Butler 144. Butler won in 1956, 1958 and 1960, with Ward having his fifth win 1957 and David Snell in 1959. In 1959 the Midland Challenge Cup was used as the qualifying event for the professionals but the championship was again used from 1960. Snell had a final round of 63 in 1959 to set a new record total of 134.

From 1961 to 1963 the Midland open was played after the Midland Amateur-Professional Foursomes. In 1964 the foursomes became a 54-hole stroke-play event and was again played after the open. From 1968 to 1971 the Midland open was a 54-hole event with the foursomes being reduced to 36-holes. With only a single round played on the first day, followed by a cut, qualification through the professional championship was no longer needed. The Midland Amateur-Professional Foursomes was last held in 1971. In 1961 Ralph Moffitt had a first round of 61 and went on to win the tournament with a record total of 130, 11 strokes ahead of anyone else. Moffitt won again in 1964 and 1970. Peter Butler had his fourth and fifth wins in 1965 and 1969, while David Snell won for the second time in 1966. In 1967 56-year-old Tom Collinge won on his home course at Olton.

From 1972 to 1974 the Midland open was again played as a one-day 36-hole event with qualification for professionals through the Midland Professional Championship. However from 1975  it was held over two days, allowing a much larger field. Brian Waites, the 1971 winner, won again in 1976 and 1981. There was an amateur winner in 1973, Keith Hodgkinson, the first since 1950, and he was soon followed by Sandy Lyle who won in 1975 after an 18-hole playoff against Brian Waites. The Welsh professional Andy Griffiths won twice, in 1978 and 1980. In 1982 the championship was turned into a 72-hole event called the Midland All Stars Championship, but struggled for sponsorship and was dropped after the 1983 season.

Winners

2003 Darren Prosser
2004 Phil Edwards
2005 Darren Prosser
2006 Paul Streeter
2007 Matt Morris
2008 Cameron Clark
2009 Not held
2010 Simon Lilly
2011 James Whatley
2012 Lee Clarke
2013 Matthew Cort
2014 Matthew Cort
2015 Peter Baker
2016 Matthew Cort
2017 Michael Reed
2018–2019 Not held
2020 Matthew Cort
2021 Paul Streeter
2022 Sam Forgan

Additional source:

References

Golf tournaments in England
Recurring sporting events established in 1923
1923 establishments in England